Zeiraphera corpulentana is a species of moth of the family Tortricidae. It is found in China (Beijing, Jilin, Heilongjiang, Anhui), Korea, Japan and Russia.

The wingspan is 17–21 mm.

The larvae feed on Syringa amurensis and Leptodermis potaninii.

References

Moths described in 1901
Eucosmini